Passfjellbreen is a glacier in Nordenskiöld Land at Spitsbergen, Svalbard, between Istjørndalen and Hollendardalen, at the northern side of Bjørnsonfjellet and Passfjellet.

References

Glaciers of Spitsbergen